Nisvai is an Oceanic language spoken in southeast Malekula, Vanuatu, on the eastern tip of the island, by about 200 speakers.

The languages surrounding Nisvai include, or used to include, Port Sandwich, Nasvang, Sörsörian, Axamb and Avok.

References

External links
 Nisvai DoReCo corpus compiled by Jocelyn Aznar. Audio recordings of narrative texts with transcriptions time-aligned at the phone level, translations, and time-aligned morphological annotations.

Malekula languages
Languages of Vanuatu
Critically endangered languages